John Roy Anderson (born 25 October 1944) is an English singer, songwriter and musician, best known as the lead singer of the progressive rock band Yes, which he formed in 1968 with bassist Chris Squire. He was a member of the band across three tenures until 2008. Anderson was also a member of ARW along with former Yes bandmates Rick Wakeman and Trevor Rabin from 2016–2020. Together with bassist Lee Pomeroy and drummer Lou Molino III, they toured under the name Yes Featuring Jon Anderson, Trevor Rabin, Rick Wakeman.

Anderson is also noted for his solo career and collaborations with other artists, including Vangelis as Jon and Vangelis, Roine Stolt as Anderson/Stolt, and Jean-Luc Ponty as AndersonPonty Band. He has also appeared on albums by King Crimson, Tangerine Dream, Iron Butterfly, Milton Nascimento, Battles, Mike Oldfield and Kitaro.

Anderson released his first solo album, Olias of Sunhillow, in 1976, while still a member of Yes, and subsequently released 14 more albums as a solo artist. Anderson became an American citizen in 2009. In 2017, he was inducted into the Rock and Roll Hall of Fame as a member of Yes.

Early life
John Roy Anderson was born on 25 October 1944 in Accrington, Lancashire, England. His father Albert was from Glasgow, Scotland, and served in the army in the entertainment division and later worked as a salesman; his mother Kathleen was of Irish and French ancestry and worked in a cotton mill, cotton being the biggest export from Lancashire at the time. Together they became county champions in ballroom dancing, winning several awards. Anderson said they named him after an English singer who toured as "John Roy the Melody Boy" and the Scottish name Royston. Anderson grew up on Norfolk Street with brothers Tony and Stuart, and sister Joy. He is the third youngest. As a youngster, Anderson became a fan of several musicians, including Elvis Presley, Eddie Cochran, the Everly Brothers, and Jon Hendricks.

Anderson attended St. John's School where he organised daily football matches during lunch break. He was not a strong academic, and remembered he "was always getting into trouble for messing around and singing too loud". There, he made a tentative start to a musical career, playing the washboard in Little John's Skiffle Group who performed songs by Lonnie Donegan, among others. At fifteen, Anderson left school after his father became ill and took up work on a farm, as a lorry driver transporting bricks, and as a milkman to help support the family. He remained a fan of the club, and was a ball boy and mascot for the team for one year. Anderson dropped the "h" from his first name in 1970.

Career

1962–1968: The Warriors and early singles
Anderson had no particular desire to become a singer at first until his brother Tony took up singing and joined the Warriors, a local group also known as the Electric Warriors. After one of the backing vocalists left the group, Anderson filled in the position, and found music more enjoyable and a better choice for money than manual labour. The group performed mainly cover songs from several artists, including the Beatles, and performed across Lancashire and the club circuit in Germany for over a year. Anderson is heard on their first two recorded songs, "You Came Along" and "Don't Make Me Blue", released in 1965. After the Warriors split in Germany in late 1967, the band returned to England while Anderson stayed behind. He briefly became singer in the Gentle Party, a band from Bolton who were in Germany.

After returning to London in March 1968, Anderson met Jack Barrie, owner of the La Chasse drinking club in Soho who befriended the rest of the Warriors after they had relocated to the city. With no money or accommodation, Barrie allowed Anderson and Warriors keyboardist and vocals Brian Chatton to stay with him. Anderson helped out by working at La Chasse; during this time he got talking to Paul Korda, a producer for EMI Records who took him on to sing several demos. During the search for material to record, Barrie got in touch with Elton John and Bernie Taupin of DJM Records to put some music together, but felt Anderson did not like much of it. Meanwhile, Anderson travelled to the Netherlands to join Les Cruches, a band he met in London, but promptly returned when he found out some of his demos were to be released as singles by Parlophone Records. Released under his pseudonym Hans Christian, the first, an orchestrated cover of "Never My Love" by the Association with "All of the Time" on its B-side, received a positive reception from New Musical Express and Chris Welch for Melody Maker who wrote in March 1968, "A blockbuster of a hit from a young fairy tale teller with an emotion packed voice." Anderson's second single, "(The Autobiography of) Mississippi Hobo"/"Sonata of Love", was released two months later; neither song was successful. Barrie and Korda then took Anderson to see local group the Gun and together rehearsed for well received gigs at the UFO and Marquee clubs in London, the latter as an opener for the Who, which led to several gig offers. However, the rest of the group believed they could reach success without a lead vocalist and sacked Anderson.

1968–1980: Forming Yes and start of solo career

In May 1968, Barrie introduced Anderson to Chris Squire, bassist of the London-based rock band Mabel Greer's Toyshop, which had previously included guitarist Peter Banks. The two talked, and found they shared common musical interests such as Simon & Garfunkel and the idea of vocal harmonies. In the following days, they developed "Sweetness", a song later recorded on the first Yes album. Anderson found himself on lead vocals for some Mabel Greer gigs afterwards, and talks of the formation of a new, full-time band developed. In June 1968, Anderson and Squire hired Bill Bruford to replace founding drummer Robert Hagger, and Anderson secured £500 from John Roberts, owner of a paper manufacturer, to rent space in The Lucky Horseshoe cafe in Soho so a new, full-time band could rehearse. At their conclusion a month later, a line-up of Anderson, Squire, Bruford, Banks, who replaced a departing Clive Bayley, and keyboardist Tony Kaye, who Anderson met in Leicester four years prior, was formed. They then renamed themselves Yes, originally Banks' idea. Anderson's first gig with Yes followed on 4 August 1968 at a youth camp in East Mersea in Essex.

Although the band had no formal leader, Anderson served as its main motivating force in their early days, doing most of the hustling for gigs and originating most of their songs. He played a key role in initiating their more ambitious artistic ideas, serving as the main instigator of some of the band's more popular songs, including "Close to the Edge", "The Gates of Delirium", and "Awaken", and the concept behind their double concept album Tales from Topographic Oceans (1973).

Despite his initial lack of instrumental skills, Anderson was strongly involved in the selection of successive Yes members chosen for their musicality - guitarist Steve Howe (who replaced Banks in 1970), Kaye's successive replacements Rick Wakeman and Patrick Moraz, and drummer Alan White, who replaced Bruford in 1972.

Ambitious and nicknamed "Napoleon" by the rest of the band, Anderson was also fond of sonic and psychological creative experiments, and in so doing contributed to occasionally conflicted relationships within the band and with management. An example of this was his original desire to record Tales from Topographic Oceans in the middle of the woods. When the band voted to record in a studio, he decided to arrange hay and animal cut-outs all over the floor to create atmosphere. Anderson described the album's supporting tour as one of the low points of his career, as a portion of the audience and the band were unhappy with the album.

In addition to Yes, Anderson appeared as a guest singer on Lizard by King Crimson for "Prince Rupert Awakes", the first part of their 23-minute title track recorded in 1970. He was chosen for the part as the desired vocal range was unattainable by the group's then-lead vocalist, Gordon Haskell. In 1974, Anderson co-wrote "Pearly Gates" with Iron Butterfly drummer Ron Bushy on the band's album Scorching Beauty. This was followed by his first collaboration with Greek musician Vangelis, singing on "So Long Ago, So Clear", the last section of "Heaven and Hell Part I" on his 1975 album Heaven and Hell.

In August 1975, Yes took an extended break for each member to release a studio album. Anderson chose a concept album, Olias of Sunhillow, about an alien race of four tribes and their journey to a new planet as theirs is under threat from destruction. Olias, one of the three main characters, builds the Moorglade Mover, an aircraft formed of living organisms to transport everyone to their new home. Anderson gained inspiration from science fiction and fantasy novels, works by J. R. R. Tolkien, The Initiation of the World by Vera Stanley Alder, and the art work from Yes's Fragile. He recorded the music from his garage in six months, learning to play all instruments himself, including several types of drum, stringed, and percussion instruments associated with world or ethnic music, which took up as many as 120 track recordings in its original form. Anderson found the experience a valuable one in learning about music. Atlantic Records released the album in July 1976, and it reached number 8 in the UK and number 47 in the US.

Between 1976 and 1979, Anderson recorded Going for the One and Tormato with Yes and completed their supporting tours. In February 1979, he reconvened with Vangelis to start recording as Jon and Vangelis. Their first album, Short Stories, was recorded in a matter of weeks with minimal preconceived ideas which Anderson found to be a refreshing experience. Released in January 1980, Short Stories went to number 4 in the UK. In 1979, Anderson played the harp on "Flamants Roses" on Vangelis's album Opéra sauvage and wrote music for Ursprung, an act for a three-part modern ballet named Underground Rumours performed by the Scottish Ballet company, that also featured music by Ian Anderson. The choreographer was Royston Maldoom and the lighting designer was David Hersey.

In October 1979, Anderson travelled to Paris to record a new Yes album with producer Roy Thomas Baker. Progress staggered early into the sessions following disputes over the band's musical direction; material prepared by Anderson and Wakeman was not met with enthusiasm by their bandmates, who started to put down tracks without them that was released on Drama. "Very quickly", recalled Anderson, "the mood changed from enthusiasm to frustration and then complete confusion". Matters failed to improve when they reconvened in February 1980, and Anderson and Wakeman left in the following month. They were replaced by Trevor Horn and Geoffrey Downes of the Buggles.

1980–1990: Solo career, return to Yes, and ABWH

Anderson acquired Jannis Zographos as his new manager, who also handled Vangelis. He recorded his first album in collaboration with Vangelis, Short Stories, which was released in 1980.  In addition, he sang on "Suffocation" and "See You Later" for Vangelis's album See You Later, also released in 1980. After he secured a recording deal with Virgin Records, Anderson retreated to southern France to write material for a solo album. His proposals for albums based on the Russian-French artist Marc Chagall and the book A True Fairy Tale by Daphne Charters were not enthusiastically received by the label's management, who lost interest and requested their advance back. Anderson spent much of 1980 recording a collection of songs for Song of Seven with a group of musicians he named the New Life Band, which Atlantic agreed to release. When it was put out in November, it reached number 38 in the UK and number 143 in the US. Anderson completed his first solo tour with the band, performing a mix of solo and Yes material in Germany and England.

In 1981, Anderson played on Wakeman's concept album 1984 and released his second album with Vangelis in July 1981, The Friends of Mr Cairo. The album produced two singles, "I'll Find My Way Home" and "State of Independence". The album was also notable for the title track, which was an ode to classic Hollywood gangster films of the 1930s and 1940s with voice impressions of Humphrey Bogart, Peter Lorre and James Stewart which paid homage to The Maltese Falcon (1941). In 1982, Anderson released Animation, and in 1983 appeared on "In High Places" from Crises by Mike Oldfield. Also that year, he performed with Béla Fleck and the Flecktones and attempted to form a band with Wakeman and Keith Emerson, but it fell through.

In early 1983, Anderson was contacted by Phil Carson of Atlantic Records who suggested that he hear a tape of demos that Cinema, a new group formed of Squire, White, Kaye, and guitarist Trevor Rabin, with Horn as producer, had developed for a new album. Anderson was invited to sing lead vocals on the album and join the group, which he accepted. Cinema then changed their name to Yes, and 90125, released in November 1983, became Yes's best selling album. In 1987, the group released its successor, Big Generator.

Anderson appeared on the song "Cage of Freedom" from the 1984 soundtrack for a re-release of the Fritz Lang film Metropolis. In 1985, his song "This Time It Was Really Right" was featured on the soundtrack for St. Elmo's Fire. He also sang "Silver Train" and "Christie" on the soundtrack to Scream for Help by John Paul Jones. Along with Tangerine Dream, he appeared on the song "Loved by the Sun" for Legend (1985). Anderson released a Christmas-themed solo album, 3 Ships (1985). Biggles: Adventures in Time (1986) features two songs sung by Anderson. In early 1986, Anderson recorded a single with Mike Oldfield (Shine) and later shot a video with him in Barbados. During this year, he recorded some demo tracks that would later be reworked. He and Vangelis also started writing new songs and recording demos for another album. Though the album was not made, they performed live together on 6 November 1986. The last three years of the 1980s saw Anderson sing on "Moonlight Desires" on Gowan's album Great Dirty World (1987), record his fifth solo album In the City of Angels, sing on "Stop Loving You" on the Toto album The Seventh One (1988), and record an album that would later be released as The Lost Tapes of Opio. He also sang on the songs "Within the Lost World" and "Far Far Cry" for the Jonathan Elias album Requiem for the Americas.

In 1988, after Yes' Big Generator tour, Anderson reunited with Bruford, Wakeman, and Howe to form Anderson Bruford Wakeman Howe (ABWH) with bassist Tony Levin. They recorded one album and supported it with a successful world tour.

1990–2004: Return to Yes and solo career
In 1990, after the ABWH tour, a series of business deals caused ABWH to reunite with the then-current members of Yes, who had been out of the public eye while searching for a new lead singer. The resulting eight-man band assumed the name Yes, and the album Union (1991) was assembled from various pieces of an in-progress second ABWH album, as well as recordings that Yes had been working on without Anderson. A successful tour followed.

Jon and Vangelis released their fourth album, Page of Life, in 1991. In 1992 Anderson appeared on Kitaro's album Dream, adding both lyrics and vocals to three songs: "Lady of Dreams", "Island of Life" and "Agreement". He also toured South America with a band that included his daughters, Deborah and Jade. He appeared on the song "Along the Amazon" which he co-wrote for violinist Charlie Bisharat's album of the same name. In 1993, Anderson started work on Change We Must, his seventh solo album, featuring a mixture of original and orchestrated versions of songs he had sung with Yes, Vangelis, and his solo career. It was released in October 1994 on EMI and Angel Records.

From 1992 to 1994, Anderson recorded the Yes album Talk (1994). "Walls", written by Rabin and Roger Hodgson, reached number 24 on the Billboard Hot Mainstream Rock Tracks chart. In July 1994, Anderson released Deseo, a solo album of Latino-influenced music. There were plans to release a live album called The Best of South America, but it was not released due to management issues (though some copies were already released by Yes Magazine). Anderson sang on the 7th Level children's video game Tuneland. Also, his son Damion released a single called "Close 2 the Hype", which featured him and Jon on vocals.

In August 1995, Anderson relocated to San Luis Obispo in California. His eighth studio album, Angels Embrace, was released on 26 September 1995 on the Higher Octave Music label. His first primarily instrumental album, it displays Anderson performing ambient music with assistance from Steve Katz and Keith Heffner on keyboards and his two daughters on vocals. Anderson followed this with Toltec, a concept album released on 30 January 1996 on Windham Hill Records that tells the story of Toltec, "a Native American concept of a group of people who have been all over the Earth, existing within different cultures throughout the centuries". The album was meant to be released in 1993 as The Power of Silence, minus the sound effects and narration added later, but it was cancelled following issues with Geffen Records.

In the mid-1990s, Anderson had planned to tour and record in China, but abandoned the idea in favour of writing and recording new music with Yes after Wakeman and Howe rejoined the band. Anderson's move to San Luis Obispo influenced the decision for Yes to record their three-night stint at the town's Fremont Theater in March 1996, as part of their subsequent studio and live album sets Keys to Ascension and Keys to Ascension 2, released in 1996 and 1997, respectively. On 12 May 1996, Anderson performed an 80-minute set at a Mother's Day concert in Paso Robles, California formed of Yes, Jon and Vangelis, and solo material. Anderson's next album, Lost Tapes of Opio, was released in 1996 on audio cassette through his Opio Foundation. Formed of songs recorded since the 1980s, proceeds from the release were donated to UNICEF.

In 1997, Anderson released the Celtic-influenced The Promise Ring with his second wife, Jane Luttenburger, sharing vocals. The album is a live recording of music performed by them and members of the Froggin' Peach Orchestra, the name given to a group of 28 musicians based in the Frog & Peach pub in San Luis Obispo. During their honeymoon in 1997, Anderson and Luttenburger recorded Earthmotherearth which was followed by The More You Know in 1998, recorded in Paris with French artist Francis Jocky. It was Anderson's last studio release for 13 years. Anderson appeared on the song "The Only Thing I Need" by act 4Him in 1999; it was recorded for Streams, a multi-group album. Steve Howe's tribute album Portraits of Bob Dylan also featured a cover of the Bob Dylan song "Sad Eyed Lady of the Lowlands" with Anderson's vocals. He also recorded with the Fellowship on their album In Elven Lands, inspired by the works of J. R. R. Tolkien.

In 2000, Anderson had started work on a sequel album to Olias of Sunhillow named The Songs of Zamran: Son of Olias. Development on the project slowed since then; in 2011, he reasoned the delay as it spans up to three hours in length, of which he has written the majority of it, but needs additional time "to figure out how to recreate it correctly". Anderson expressed a wish of putting out an interactive album with "an app that allows people to go on a journey, [to] choose a new journey every time they open it up, and hear it in a different way every time".

In September 2004, Yes wrapped their 35th Anniversary Tour and they entered a four-and-a-half year hiatus. In the tour's last week, Anderson was suffering from stress, asthma, bronchitis, and exhaustion.

2004–2009: Resuming solo career
In 2004, Anderson appeared with the Contemporary Youth Orchestra of Cleveland and returned in 2010 for a second performance. A show broadcast from Washington D.C. on satellite radio was released on a DVD called Tour of the Universe in 2005. This release coincided with the release of Anderson's single "State of Independence".

In 2006, Anderson performed "Roundabout" with the Trans-Siberian Orchestra. Later that year, Anderson and Wakeman toured the UK.

In 2007, Anderson sang on Culture of Ascent by Glass Hammer, and appeared as part of a vocal ensemble on "Repentance" on Systematic Chaos by Dream Theater. Also in 2007, Anderson toured as part of the Paul Green School of Rock Music.

In 2008, Anderson released From Me to You, an ambient album of his vocals with birdsong, which was added to The Lost Tapes. He appeared on "Sadness of Flowing" which he co-wrote for Peter Machajdík's album Namah and he made similar contributions to a re-mastering of Tommy Zvoncheck's album ZKG.

In May 2008, during plans for a Yes tour to commemorate the band's fortieth anniversary, Anderson suffered an asthma attack, and was diagnosed with respiratory failure. In 2009, Anderson had regained enough strength to complete a solo European tour named Have Guitar, Will Travel. This was followed by a North American leg through 2010. A sample of Anderson's vocals from Mike Oldfield's "In High Places" is prominently featured on "Dark Fantasy" by Kanye West.

2010–present: Solo work, collaborations, Yes feat. ARW and tours

In 2010, Anderson and Wakeman resumed touring as Anderson/Wakeman and released their first collaborative album, The Living Tree. In June 2011, Anderson released his fourteenth solo album Survival & Other Stories. He invited people to submit music to him online and used them as the basis for the new material. In October 2011, Anderson released a single-track EP entitled Open, a 20-minute piece with a group of additional musicians including orchestral arrangements and a choir. In 2012, Anderson continued work on a sequel to Olias of Sunhillow. In January 2013, he announced that the project is named The Songs of Zamran: Son of Olias.

In 2013, Anderson performed solo shows worldwide, including Australia, North America, Europe, and Iceland, followed by a North and South American tour from February 2014. Later in 2014, a charity single featuring Anderson and Matt Malley entitled "The Family Circle" was released.

From 2014 to 2016, Anderson collaborated on a recording and touring project with violinist and composer Jean-Luc Ponty named Anderson Ponty. He announced the project in July 2014, with the intent on releasing an album of original songs and music the two had written in their own careers with new arrangements. Ponty stated: "The idea is to keep our musical personalities and the original sounds, but the production will be more modern". The pair toured with a backing band from 2014 to 2016 and released a live album and DVD, Better Late Than Never.

During his time collaborating with Ponty, Anderson was also working on a studio album with Swedish guitarist and songwriter Roine Stolt. Their album Invention of Knowledge was released in 2016, and features various members of Stolt's band the Flower Kings as additional musicians.
In January 2016, Anderson announced the formation of Anderson, Rabin and Wakeman, a new group formed together with Trevor Rabin and Rick Wakeman, with the intention to tour and record new material. They completed two concert tours and a live album release in September 2018. A studio album of new material was in progress. The group had disbanded by 2020,

In April 2017, Yes were inducted into the Rock and Roll Hall of Fame. Anderson sang "Roundabout" and "Owner of a Lonely Heart" at the ceremony. Anderson released his solo album 1000 Hands: Chapter One in March 2019. He had started it almost 30 years prior and named the album accordingly due to the many musicians that play on it, including Steve Howe, Jean-Luc Ponty, Chick Corea, and Billy Cobham. Anderson plans to release the album in three parts, with a tour currently following the first part, which he wants to document on film.

In December 2018, Anderson released a video for a new song, "Love Is Everything", to promote 1000 Hands, though it did not appear on the album.

On 30 June 2021, Anderson announced a Summer 2021 11-city tour of US theaters with the Paul Green Rock Academy that kicked off 30 July in Patchogue, New York, and wrapped up 20 August in Woonsocket, Rhode Island.

Musical style
It is a commonly held misconception that Anderson sings falsetto, a vocal technique which naturally produces high, airy notes by using only the ligamentous edges of the vocal cords; however, this is not the case. Anderson's normal singing/speaking voice is naturally above the tenor range. In a 2008 interview with the Pittsburgh Post-Gazette, Anderson stated, "I'm an alto tenor and I can sing certain high notes, but I could never sing falsetto, so I go and hit them high."

According to Anderson's web site, he "is also responsible for most of the mystically themed lyrics and concepts which are part of many Yes releases... The lyrics are frequently inspired by various books Anderson has enjoyed, from Tolstoy's War and Peace to Hermann Hesse's Siddhartha. A footnote in Paramahansa Yogananda's Autobiography of a Yogi inspired an entire double album Tales from Topographic Oceans (1973). Recurring themes include environmentalism, pacifism and sun worship." Anderson has said elsewhere that his lyrics are designed less with literary intent than to add tone and texture to the music, and his works often make use of assonances and emphasis on open vowels to this effect.

Personal life

Family
Anderson married Jennifer Baker on 22 December 1969; they divorced in 1995. They have three children: Deborah (born 1970), Damion (b. 1972) and Jade (b. 1980). Deborah is a photographer and sang on her father's solo album Song of Seven (1980), Anderson Bruford Wakeman Howe (1989), and Angel Milk (2005) by the French electronica band Télépopmusik. Damion is a musician and spoke the final lines on the Yes song "Circus of Heaven" on Tormato (1978) when he was six years old. He released the EP Close to the Hype (1994) with his father. Jade's birth is celebrated in her father's song "Animation" on his album of the same name. She sang backing vocals on many of his later albums and released a solo album in Japan.

In 1997, Anderson married American Jane Luttenberger. Yes drummer Alan White was his best man at the ceremony. In 2009, Anderson became an American citizen.

His goddaughter was Ariane Forster, better known as Ari Up, lead singer of the Slits.

Health and spirituality
Anderson was a smoker in the 1960s and 1970s and once tried cocaine, but "didn't like it." He now lives a healthier lifestyle, particularly in his later life, with vitamin supplements and meditation. In the mid-1970s, Anderson became a vegetarian, as did most members of Yes; however, in an interview he stated, "I was a veggie for a while, but again I grew out of that. But I do eat very healthy." In a 16 August 2006 interview on The Howard Stern Show, Anderson said he eats meat, mostly fish, on occasion. In the interview, he also stated he had a spiritual adviser that "helped him see into the fourth dimension". Before live performances, he often meditates in a tent with crystals and dreamcatchers, a practice he started in the 1980s. Anderson's religious beliefs are syncretic and varied, including respect for the Divine Mother Audrey Kitagawa.

On 13 May 2008, Anderson suffered a severe asthma attack which required a stay in hospital. According to Yes' website, he was later "at home and resting comfortably." Yes' planned summer 2008 tour was subsequently cancelled, with the press release saying, "Jon Anderson was admitted to the hospital last month after suffering a severe asthma attack. He was diagnosed with acute respiratory failure and was told by doctors to rest and not work for a period of at least six months." Further health problems continued through 2008, resulting in Yes permanently replacing Anderson with vocalists Benoît David (2009–2012) and Jon Davison (2012–present). In September 2008, Anderson wrote that he's "so much better...so grateful and so blessed...I look forward to 2009 for the "Great Work" to come." He started singing again in early 2009. He returned to touring (solo) that year, performing along with Peter Machajdík and an ensemble of Slovakian musicians on Tribute To Freedom, an event to commemorate the fall of the Iron Curtain in former Czechoslovakia at Devin Castle near Bratislava, Slovakia, and continued touring in 2010 and the autumn of 2011, with Rick Wakeman for a UK tour (2010) and the eastern US (2011).

Honours 

Tours

Discography

Solo albums
 Olias of Sunhillow (1976)
 Song of Seven (1980)
 Animation (1982) 
 3 Ships (1985)
 In the City of Angels (1988)
 Deseo (1994)
 Change We Must (1994)
 Angels Embrace (1995)
 Toltec (1996)
 Lost Tapes of Opio (1996)
 The Promise Ring (1997)
 Earth Mother Earth (1997)
 The More You Know (1998)
 Survival & Other Stories (2011)
 1000 Hands: Chapter One (2019)

References 
 

Bibliography

External links

Jon Anderson Interview - NAMM Oral History Library, January 19, 2016

1944 births
Living people
English rock singers
Yes (band) members
Columbia Records artists
People from Accrington
Progressive rock musicians
Anderson Bruford Wakeman Howe members
English people of Scottish descent
English people of Irish descent
English people of French descent
English multi-instrumentalists
20th-century English male singers
20th-century English singers
21st-century English male singers
21st-century English singers
English tenors
Symphonic rock musicians
Countertenors
British autoharp players